Dartmoor School is an independent school offering one-to-one personalized education at four campuses in the Puget Sound region (Bellevue, Issaquah, Seattle and Bothell). Founded in 1990 by reading specialist Doris J. Bower, Dartmoor began as a reading intervention school. Mrs. Bower saw a need for alternative approaches to education. She started Dartmoor School to ensure success for all types of learners by developing the one-to-one model of instruction that Dartmoor continues to provide to this day.

Dartmoor's success in teaching reading fundamentals soon led to requests for a greater variety of academic subjects. Demand for credit courses and the desire to graduate from Dartmoor increased, prompting Dartmoor's accreditation and, ultimately, its transformation from a learning center into an independent school in the early 1990s.

Dartmoor's ability to work effectively with a diverse population also attracted school districts needing to place students in an individualized educational setting. To facilitate these placements, Dartmoor became a Non-Public Agency (NPA) in the 1990s.

Today, Dartmoor is still pervasively informed by its founding principles of student respect, commitment to diverse learners, and cultivation of its students' self-realization. Though student needs have encouraged Dartmoor's growth in unforeseen directions, the school has remained faithful to its founder's vision of a place where students, rather than abstractions, center the educational experience.

Dartmoor is accredited by AdvancEd and approved by OSPI as a private school and Non-Public Agency. High School coursework is approved by the NCAA. Dartmoor is an affiliate member of NAIS. Dartmoor's campuses are open year-round and offer open enrollment and flexible scheduling.

References

External links
 
 AdvancED
 WFIS
 NAIS

Alternative schools in the United States
Buildings and structures in King County, Washington
Private elementary schools in Washington (state)
Private high schools in Washington (state)
Private middle schools in Washington (state)
Schools in Seattle